Gushan railway station is a station on the Beijing–Baotou railway in Datong City, Shanxi. Not to be confused with the Gushan railway station in Taiwan.

Railway stations in Shanxi